This is a list of exoplanets detected by microlensing, sorted by discovery date. To find planets using this method, the background star is temporarily magnified by a foreground star because of the gravity that bends light. If the foreground star has a planet, the light from background star would be slightly brighter than the star with no planet. Studying the brightness difference of background star between the foreground star with planets and foreground star with no planets, then mass can be estimated. The projected separation can be determined from how much the light bended.

The least massive planet detected by microlensing is KMT-2020-BLG-0414Lb, which has about the same mass as Earth. The widest separation between a planet and a star is OGLE-2008-BLG-092Lb, which is ~15 AU; the shortest separation is MOA-2015-BLG-337Lb, which is 0.24 AU. There are 7 known multi-planetary systems detected by microlensing, all of which have two planets.

List 
Yellow rows denote the members of multi-planet systems.

Candidate rogue planets

A number of candidate rogue planets have been detected by microlensing.

Unconfirmed detections

Some microlensing events, such as MACHO-98-BLG-35 and PA-99-N2, suggest the possible presence of a planetary companion to the lensing star, but this is unconfirmed. Since microlensing relies on a one-time chance alignment, it is likely not possible to confirm these detections.

In some cases, a planetary interpretation for a microlensing event was proposed, but has been disproven. MACHO-1997-BLG-41 was initially interpreted as a binary star system orbited by a circumbinary planet, but a different model with two stars and no planet was later found to be a better fit to the data. Similarly, OGLE-2013-BLG-0723L was initially interpreted as a binary system of a star and a brown dwarf, with a low-mass planet orbiting the brown dwarf, but a model where the system consists of two low-mass stars with no planet was found to be a better fit to the data.

See also
 List of exoplanets

Notes

References

External links 
 
 

 
Detected by microlensing